Buseu is a hamlet located in the municipality of Baix Pallars, in Province of Lleida province, Catalonia, Spain. As of 2020, it has a population of 1.

Geography 
Buseu is located 131km north-northeast of Lleida.

References

Populated places in the Province of Lleida